Belikov is a Russian male surname, its feminine counterpart is Belikova. It may refer to
Konstantin Belikov (1909–1987), Russian football defender and referee
Sergey Belikov (born 1954), Russian singer, musician and composer
Jarmila Belikova (1948–2010), Czech psychologist and activist
Marina Belikova (born 1985), Russian sport shooter
Svetlana Belikova, fictional characters in Resident Evil Damnation
Dimitri Belikov, fictional character in Vampire Academy & in the film adaptation, Vampire Academy (film), played by Danila Kozlovsky